Wang Hanlin (Chinese: 王翰林; born 11 November 1989 in Dalian, Liaoning) is a Chinese footballer who currently plays as a defender for Chengdu Rongcheng.

Club career
In 2010, Wang Hanlin started his professional footballer career with Chengdu Tiancheng in the China League One. He would eventually make his top tier league debut for Chengdu on 6 July 2011 in a game against Guangzhou Evergrande, coming on as a substitute for Zhang Li in the 79th minute, in a game that ended in a 4-0 defeat. Unfortunately he would be part of the team that was relegated at the end of the season, however he would go on to establish himself as a regular within the team until 5 January 2015 when the club dissolved due to financial arrears.

In March 2016, Wang signed for China League Two side Jiangxi Liansheng. He would play for two seasons until he joined Chengdu Better City (now renamed as Chengdu Rongcheng) as they participated in the 2018 Chinese Champions League.
He would go on to win promotion with the club as they came runners-up at the end of the 2019 China League Two season. He would be a regular within the team as he aided them to a meteoric rise through the divisions as the club gained promotion to the top tier at the end of the 2021 league campaign.

Career statistics 
Statistics accurate as of match played 8 January 2023.

References

External links
Player profile at Soccerway.com

1989 births
Living people
Chinese footballers
Footballers from Dalian
Chengdu Tiancheng F.C. players
Jiangxi Beidamen F.C. players
Chengdu Better City F.C. players
Chinese Super League players
China League One players
China League Two players
Association football defenders